Ali Mombaini (born November 22, 1981) is an Iranian footballer who plays for Aluminium in Azadegan League.

Club career
In 2010, Mombaini joined Sanat Naft after spending the previous two season at Moghavemat.

Assists

References

Iranian footballers
Fajr Sepasi players
Sanat Naft Abadan F.C. players
Sanat Mes Kerman F.C. players
1981 births
Living people
Association football midfielders